Harald Bundli (born 15 April 1953) is a Norwegian cyclist born in Oslo.

He competed at the 1972 Summer Olympics in Munich, and at the 1976 Summer Olympics in Montréal.

References

1953 births
Living people
Cyclists from Oslo
Olympic cyclists of Norway
Cyclists at the 1972 Summer Olympics
Cyclists at the 1976 Summer Olympics